Harold Davies (18 November 1932 – 14 September 2002) was an Australian rules footballer who played with St Kilda in the Victorian Football League (VFL).

Notes

External links 
		

2002 deaths
1932 births
Australian rules footballers from Victoria (Australia)
St Kilda Football Club players